Sviloš is a village in Serbia. It is situated in the Beočin municipality, in the Vojvodina province. Although, the village is geographically located in Syrmia, it is part of the South Bačka District. The village has a Serb ethnic majority and its population numbering 362 people (2002 census).

History

During the Axis occupation in World War II, 116 civilians were killed in Sviloš by fascists.

Historical population

1961: 417
1971: 419
1981: 367
1991: 347

References
Miloš Lukić, Putevima slobode - naselja opštine Beočin u ratu i revoluciji, Novi Sad, 1987.
Slobodan Ćurčić, Broj stanovnika Vojvodine, Novi Sad, 1996.

See also
List of places in Serbia
List of cities, towns and villages in Vojvodina

Populated places in Syrmia
South Bačka District
Beočin